Reinhold Curicke (12 January 1610 – 2 April 1667) was a jurist and historian from Danzig (Gdańsk)  who specialized in the history of the city, including its past as principal city of province of Royal Prussia in the Polish–Lithuanian Commonwealth. and its connections with Hanseatic merchant organization.

In 1645, Curicke published a German language four-volume work: Der Stadt Danzig historische Beschreibung .... This historical description of Danzig was the first  monograph about the city. It covers the origins of the city, its government, wars and religious history.

His son, Georg Reinhold Curicke, commissioned a posthumous publication with copper etchings to illustrate the history were printed in 1687 in Danzig and Amsterdam.

Works 
 Secretarius Reinhold Curicke: Der Stadt Dantzig historische Beschreibung, worinnen von dero Uhrsprung Situation Regiments-Art geführten Kriegen Religions- und Kirchen-Wesen außführlich gehandelt wird. Verfasset u. zusammengetragen durch Curicke i. J. 1645. (original edition)
 ... Anitzo aber mit sonderbahren Fleiss, nebst vielen dazu gehörigen Kupferstücken in öffentlichen Druck aufgegeben von G. Reinhold Curicken, 1686. (posthumous edition with copper etchings)
 ... Und mit vielen newen Additionibus vermehrt und continuiert biß auff die gegenwertige Zeit. Johan und Gillis Janssons von Waesberge, 1688, Amsterdam/Dantzig (updated and expanded edition, reprinted by Paul Rosenberg, Danziger Verlagsgesellschaft, Klausdorf bei Kiel, 1987)

References

External links
Apotheosis of Jan III Sobieski as a Roman Emperor (as part of the Reinhold Curick’s Der Stadt Dantzig historische Beschreibung) at the Wilanów Palace Museum
 Entry of Reinhold Curicke in Rostock Matrikelportal

See also 
 List of people from Danzig

1610 births
1667 deaths

17th-century German historians
Writers from Gdańsk
German male non-fiction writers